Karl-Siegmund Litzmann (1 August 1893, in Minden, Westphalia – August 1945, in Kappeln, Schleswig-Holstein) was the German General Commissioner for Generalbezirk Estland (Estonia) in the Reichskommissariat Ostland during the German occupation.

He was SA-Obergruppenführer and served from 5 December 1941 to 17 September 1944 in Tallinn (Reval). Karl-Siegmund Litzmann was the son of the general of the infantry Karl Litzmann and uncle of Walter Lehweß-Litzmann.

In late 1944 he became an officer of the Waffen SS, and went missing after the fighting in Hungary and Bohemia in spring 1945.
Litzmann reappeared in May 1945 under a false name in Kappeln (Schleswig-Holstein) where his sister was living, but died there under unexplained circumstances as early as August 1945.

References 

1893 births
1945 deaths
People from Minden
People from the Province of Westphalia
German Protestants
Nazi Party politicians
Members of the Reichstag of Nazi Germany
Members of the Landtag of Prussia
People of Generalbezirk Estland
Waffen-SS personnel
German military personnel of World War I
Recipients of the Iron Cross (1914), 1st class